Mehmet Erkut Şentürk (born 6 May 1994) is a Turkish footballer who plays as a midfielder for Amed. He made his Süper Lig debut against Orduspor on 28 January 2013.

References

Erkut Şentürk Antalyaspor'da - Eskişehirspor, spor26.com, 10 January 2016

External links
 
 
 

1994 births
Living people
People from Bakırköy
Footballers from Istanbul
Turkish footballers
Turkey youth international footballers
Eskişehirspor footballers
Fatih Karagümrük S.K. footballers
Süper Lig players
TFF Second League players
Association football midfielders